Yegor Sergeyevich Omelyanenko (born 10 July 1993) is a Russian former professional ice hockey player. He played for Amur Khabarovsk of the Kontinental Hockey League (KHL) and Podhale Nowy Targ of the Polska Hokej Liga.

Omelyanenko made his Kontinental Hockey League debut and played for Amur Khabarovsk during the 2012–13 Nadezhda Cup.

References

External links

1993 births
Living people
Amur Khabarovsk players
Russian ice hockey left wingers
Podhale Nowy Targ players